

Fauxliage is a musical project consisting of Canadian electronic musicians Bill Leeb and Rhys Fulber, both of Delerium and Front Line Assembly, and Leigh Nash of Sixpence None the Richer in 2007. The vocals are performed exclusively by Nash.

Many of the songs from this album have been on the soundtrack of the television series Moonlight.

Track listing

Personnel

Musicians
 Leigh Nash – vocals, writing (1–4, 6–11)
 Bill Leeb – writing (1–3, 6–11), production
 Rhys Fulber – writing (4, 5), production
 Leah Randi – bass (1, 2, 4, 5, 7, 8), vocals (5)
 Roy Salmond – guitar (1–3, 6–9), keyboard (1–3, 6–9), writing (1–3, 6–11)
 Mike Hiratzka – programming (1)
 Ashwin Sood – drums (2, 3, 9)
 Emerson Swinford – guitar (2, 4, 5)
 Mark Jowett – guitar (3, 6), programming (3, 6)
 Andy Holt – programming (3, 6)
 Chris Elliot – arrangement (4), keyboard (4), writing (4)

Technical personnel
 Ted Jensen – mastering
 Greg Reely – mixing

References

2007 albums
Collaborative albums
Nettwerk Records albums